The Warrwa, also spelt Warwa, are an Aboriginal Australian people of  the Kimberley region of Western Australia.

Language
Warrwa is an eastern Nyulnyulan language, sufficiently closely related to Nyigina to be classified as a dialect of the latter.

Country
Their inland extension reached as far as the upper Logue River. Their presence on the Fitzroy River was thought to run only as far as Yeeda. To their north lay the Umiida, on their eastern flank were the Unggumi, while the Nyigina were on their southern frontier.

Pre-contact times
According to Tindale, in pre-contact times, the Warrwa were affected by the movement of the Nyigina down the Fitzroy river, which effectively drove a wedge between Warrwa clans, that were subsequently cut off from each other. The incoming Nyigina distinguished thereafter the western Warwa ('little Warrwa') from the eastern Warrwa around Derby and Meda ('big Warrwa.').

Alternative names
 Waruwa.
 Warwai, Warrwai.
 Kolaruma. (an Unggumi exonym for them meaning 'people of the coast'.)

Notes

Citations

Sources

Aboriginal peoples of Western Australia